Channel X Radio is a network of adult contemporary/oldies/full-service formatted American radio stations in Aroostook County, Maine. With studios in Caribou the stations are heard through various transmitters throughout Aroostook County.

History
The CanXus Broadcasting Corporation was founded in Maine in May 1986. Shortly after that, CanXus submitted an application to put a 3,000–watt transmitter on the Green Ridge Road, or on the Caribou/Fort Fairfield town line. On November 15, 1986 at 6:00 p.m., WCXU Caribou began operation on 97.7 MHz.  The studios and offices were in a single-wide trailer while the transmitter was 400 feet away.

With a 3 kW signal and a small transmitter, people north of Caribou couldn't get the signal.  Madawaska was the first place to get a satellite station.  On January 30, 1988 WCXX 102.3 Madawaska began atop 11th Avenue Extension in a tiny studio, rebroadcasting WCXU.  The signal reached all the way to Caribou.

Because of the valley-like nature, and the small power that WCXX transmits, the signal is degraded in most of Fort Kent. In late 1994, CanXus applied for W276AY on 103.1 MHz.  This very small signal is located near the Northern Maine Medical Center and reaches only Fort Kent and surrounding towns.  At the same time WCXU doubled its power to 6 kW, then later increased the output to 20 kW.  Now the signal can go all the way to Houlton and Fort Kent in a  radius.  Since then, the transmitter building has doubled in size, the transmitter has become a little bigger (now Height Above Average Terrain (HAAT) of 90 m) and in 1998, Channel X moved to its new studio-office with state-of-the-art computerized broadcasting equipment.

In late 2006 WCXV in Van Buren began to simulcast Channel X Radio. It broadcast at a lower power until December 27, 2007 when WCXV began broadcasting at the full 6 kW. Recently CanXus changed their construction permit to decrease its HAAT to 1 m.

Programing
Channel X Radio plays a mix of adult contemporary, oldies, and local music.  It is home to one of the longest running oldies and retro music programs in the region.  Furthermore, Channel X Radio covers local events and broadcasts live interviews from around the region. The station broadcasts local sports updates and news stories on a daily basis.

References

External links

Mass media in Aroostook County, Maine
Mainstream adult contemporary radio stations in the United States
Presque Isle, Maine
Radio stations established in 1986
1986 establishments in Maine